The Prime Minister of Curaçao is the head of government of Curaçao. The post was created after the Netherlands Antilles had been dissolved on 10 October 2010 and Curaçao became a country within the Kingdom of the Netherlands. The Prime Minister, together with his Council of Ministers and the Governor of Curaçao form the executive branch of the government of Curaçao.

Cabinet Schotte
Curaçao's first Prime Minister was Gerrit Schotte. His government stepped down upon losing a majority in the Estates of Curaçao, the unicameral legislature and continued to operate in a demissionary capacity, responsible for current affairs and called elections. The majority of the estates however demanded that he should be removed from his office before the elections. The motions to that effect were passed outside normal parliamentary procedure, as the president of the Estates did convene the estates before the elections.

List of prime ministers of Curaçao

References

Government of Curaçao